The 2007 Philadelphia Soul season was the fourth season for the franchise. They look to make the playoffs again after finishing 2006 with a 9–7 record.  After posting an 8–8 record in the regular season, they hosted their first-ever home playoff game on June 29 against the Orlando Predators, whom they defeated to help clinch the home game the previous week. They subsequently defeated the Predators 41–26.

Schedule

Playoffs

Coaching
Bret Munsey started his second season as head coach of the Soul.

2007 roster

Stats

Offense

Quarterback

Running backs

Wide receivers

Touchdowns

Defense

Special teams

Kick return

Kicking

Playoff Stats

Offense

Quarterback

Running backs

Wide receivers

Special teams

Kick return

Kicking

Regular season

Week 2: at Nashville Kats
at the Gaylord Entertainment Center, Nashville, Tennessee

Scoring summary:

1st Quarter:

2nd Quarter:

3rd Quarter:

4th Quarter:

Week 3: at Grand Rapids Rampage
at Van Andel Arena, Grand Rapids, Michigan

Scoring summary:

1st Quarter:

2nd Quarter:

3rd Quarter:

4th Quarter:

Week 4: vs Colorado Crush
at the Wachovia Center, Philadelphia

Scoring summary:

1st Quarter:

2nd Quarter:

3rd Quarter:

4th Quarter:

Week 5: at New York Dragons
at the Nassau Coliseum, Uniondale, New York

Scoring summary:

1st Quarter:

2nd Quarter:

3rd Quarter:

4th Quarter:

Week 6: vs Georgia Force
at the Wachovia Center, Philadelphia

Scoring summary:

1st Quarter:

2nd Quarter:

3rd Quarter:

4th Quarter:

Week 7: at Dallas Desperados
at the American Airlines Center, Dallas

Scoring summary:

1st Quarter:

2nd Quarter:

3rd Quarter:

4th Quarter:

Week 8: at Columbus Destroyers
at Nationwide Arena, Columbus, Ohio

Scoring summary:

1st Quarter:

2nd Quarter:

3rd Quarter:

4th Quarter:

Week 9: at Chicago Rush
at Allstate Arena, Rosemont, Illinois

Scoring summary:

1st Quarter:

2nd Quarter:

3rd Quarter:

4th Quarter:

Week 10: vs Kansas City Brigade
at the Wachovia Spectrum, Philadelphia

Scoring summary:

1st Quarter:

2nd Quarter:

3rd Quarter:

4th Quarter:

Week 11: vs New York Dragons
at the Wachovia Center, Philadelphia

Scoring summary:

1st Quarter:

2nd Quarter:

3rd Quarter:

4th Quarter:

Week 12: vs New Orleans VooDoo
at the Wachovia Center, Philadelphia

Scoring summary:

1st Quarter:

2nd Quarter:

3rd Quarter:

4th Quarter:

Week 13: at Austin Wranglers
at Frank Erwin Center, Austin, Texas

Scoring summary:

1st Quarter:

2nd Quarter:

3rd Quarter:

4th Quarter:

Week 14: vs Dallas Desperados
at the Wachovia Center, Philadelphia

Scoring summary:

1st Quarter:

2nd Quarter:

3rd Quarter:

4th Quarter:

Week 15: at Tampa Bay Storm
at the St. Pete Times Forum, Tampa, Florida

Scoring summary:

1st Quarter:

2nd Quarter:

3rd Quarter:

4th Quarter:

Week 16: vs Columbus Destroyers
at the Wachovia Spectrum, Philadelphia

Scoring summary:

1st Quarter:

2nd Quarter:

3rd Quarter:

4th Quarter:

Week 17: vs Orlando Predators
at the Wachovia Center, Philadelphia

Scoring summary:

1st Quarter:

2nd Quarter:

3rd Quarter:

4th Quarter:

Playoffs

Week 1: vs (5) Orlando Predators
at the Wachovia Center, Philadelphia

Scoring summary:

1st Quarter:

2nd Quarter:

3rd Quarter:

4th Quarter:

External links

Philadelphia Soul
Philadelphia Soul seasons
2007 in sports in Pennsylvania